List of ports in Indonesia, sorted by location.

Java
Port of Cirebon, Cirebon, West Java
Port of Merak, Banten
Port of Tanjung Priok, Jakarta
Ciwandan, Banten
Sunda Kelapa, Jakarta
Port of Patimban, Subang Regency, West Java
Port of Pramuka, Garut Regency, West Java
Port of Tanjung Perak, Surabaya, East Java
Port of Tanjung Emas, Semarang, Central Java
Tanjung Intan, Cilacap, Central Java
Port of Ketapang, Banyuwangi, East Java
Kalianget, Madura

Sumatra
Port of Kuala Tanjung, Batubara Regency, North Sumatra
Port of Bakauheni, Lampung
Ulèë Lheuë, Aceh
Port of Belawan, Medan, North Sumatra
Sibolga
Palembang, South Sumatra
Port of Teluk Bayur, West Sumatra
Jambi, Jambi
Bengkulu, Bengkulu
Panjang, Lampung
Pangkal Balam, Bangka-Belitung
Tanjung Pandan, Bangka-Belitung
Sungai Pakning, Dumai, Riau
Port of Tanjung Pinang, Tanjung Pinang, Riau Islands
Port of Krueng Geukueh, North Aceh, Aceh
Gunung Kijang, Bintan

Kalimantan
Port of Trisakti, Banjarmasin, South Kalimantan
Pontianak, West Kalimantan
Balikpapan, East Kalimantan
Sampit, Central Kalimantan
Palaran Container Terminal, Samarinda, East Kalimantan
Port of Tanjungpura, Mempawah Regency, West Kalimantan
Tarakan, North Kalimantan

Sulawesi
Port of Makassar, Makassar, South Sulawesi
Malili, South Sulawesi
Parepare, South Sulawesi
Port of Bitung, Bitung, North Sulawesi
Gorontalo, Gorontalo

Nusa Tenggara
Gilimanuk, Bali
Tanjung Benoa, Bali
Lembar, Lombok
Waingapu, Sumba
Kupang, West Timor

Maluku & Papua
Port of Sorong, Sorong, West Papua
Port of Depapre, Jayapura Regency, Papua
Port of Biak, Biak Numfor Regency, Papua

See also
 Indonesia Port Corporations
 Transport in Indonesia

Further reading
Touwen, Jeroen (editor) (2001) Shipping and trade in the Java Sea region, 1870-1940 : a collection of statistics on the major Java Sea ports Leiden, Netherlands: KITLV Press.

External links
Indonesia Port Corporation I
Indonesia Port Corporation II
Indonesia Port Corporation III
Indonesia Port Corporation IV

Infrastructure in Indonesia

Indonesia